Club Deportivo Nuestra Señora de Belén, also known as BigMat Fontecha for sponsorship reasons, is a Spanish women's football club from Burgos.

History
Originally established in 1990 as Rayo Burgalés in 1990, it took its current name in 1997. It was one of the eleven founding members of the Superliga Femenina in 2001, taking part in three seasons before being relegated in 2005. Since then it was always played in the second tier, except on the 2013–14, when the club claimed the Regional League title.

On 4 June 2019, Nuestra Señora de Belén agreed an affiliation agreement with men's club Burgos CF.

Season by season

References

External links
Nstra. Sra. Belén at Txapeldunak

Women's football clubs in Spain
Association football clubs established in 1990
Football clubs in Castile and León
Sport in Burgos
1990 establishments in Spain